Ottenberg is a surname. Notable people with the surname include:

 Hans-Günter Ottenberg (born 1947), German musicologist and teacher
 Mel Ottenberg, American fashion designer
 Nettie Ottenberg (1887–1922), Russian-born American social worker and advocate for women's suffrage
 Miriam Ottenberg (1914–1982), American journalist
 Reuben Ottenberg (1882–1959), American physician and haematologist